The Australian Independent Record Awards (commonly known informally as AIR Awards) is an annual awards night to recognise, promote and celebrate the success of Australia's Independent Music sector.

History
The inaugural 2006 awards were held at Blacket Hotel in Sydney on 29 November 2006 and sponsored by V energy drinks. The following awards ceremonies were held between October and December in Melbourne, Victoria from 2007 to 2015. 

In December 2008 it was announced that Jägermeister, previously a "headline sponsor", would become the major sponsors until 2010. When a further three-year deal for sponsorship by Jägermeister was announced in 2010, the awards were renamed the Jägermeister Independent Music Awards. In 2013, Carlton Dry became the major sponsor, with the awards renamed Carlton Dry Independent Music Awards.

There were no awards in 2016, due to a move in the eligibility dates for the AIR Awards to align with the calendar year. The 2017 awards thus saw a slightly longer eligibility period than usual with members' releases period between 1 August 2015 and 31 December 2016.

From 2017–2019, the South Australian Government's newly established Live Music Events Fund promised funding to the Awards and concurrent music conference, to take place in Adelaide, South Australia. The events took place in July, along with Music SA's Umbrella: Winter City Sounds, a program of live music across Adelaide, and a couple of food and wine festivals in the city.

Since 2020, The Awards were held at the Freemasons Hall, Adelaide.

Categories
The AIR Independent Music Awards are co-ordinated by The Australian Independent Record Labels Association), a non-profit, member-owned organisation representing Australia's independent recording sector.

In the inaugural edition, four awards were presented, Best Performing Independent Album, Best Performing Independent Single/EP, Best Performing Independent Single/EP and Best New Independent Artist. 
The "performing" element was dropped from the award the following year. 
Genre specific awards were introduced from 2007. 
The award for Best New Independent Artist changed to Breakthrough Independent Artist in 2009.

Since 2017, Nominees for the Awards must be released between the period 1 January to 31 December, preceding the Awards.
All nominees must be Australian artists, must be self-released or released on an Australian independent label.
All nominated master recordings must be entirely owned by an Australian artist or Australian Independent Label.
For the purposes of these awards, Australian Independent Labels are businesses that are not owned in part or whole by one of the three major labels. For the avoidance of doubt, if an Australian Independent Label chooses to distribute it's catalogue through a third-party major label, they will remain eligible for the awards.

Judging process
The AIR invites all of its artist, associate, full and distributor members to put forward releases from the eligibility period for a long-list and releases which have charted in the AIR Music Charts during the eligibility period are also eligible for the long-list.
The long list is presented to a voting academy of approximately 400 judges. The judging pool includes broadcasters (community radio, commercial radio, ABC Radio, music television channels and ABC television), artists, online music media, newspapers, AIR Members and other independent music industry representatives.

Judges choose their three favourite releases across the following categories: 

 Independent Album of the Year
 Breakthrough Independent Artist of the Year
 Independent Song of the Year
 Best Independent Hip Hop Album/EP
 Best Independent Soul or R&B Album/EP
 Best Independent Country Album/EP
 Best Independent Blues & Roots Album/EP
 Best Independent Pop Album/EP
 Best Independent Punk Album/EP
 Best Independent Rock Album/EP
 Best Independent Heavy Album/EP

There are also specialist voting academies for:

 Best Independent Children's Album/EP
 Best Independent Classical Album/EP
 Best Independent Dance, Electronica, or Club Album/EP
 Best Independent Dance, Electronica, or Club Single
 Best Independent Jazz Album/EP

Ceremonies

See also

 Music of Australia

References

AIR Awards
2006 establishments in Australia
Australian music awards
Awards established in 2006
Recurring events established in 2006